Ecuador will compete at the 2011 Pan American Games in Guadalajara, Mexico from October 14 to 30, 2011. Ecuador's team will consist of 170 athletes in 27 sports.

Medalists

Archery

Ecuador has qualified three male and one female athletes in the archery competition.

Men

Women

Athletics

Men

Track and road events

Field events

Women

Track and road events

Field events

Badminton

Ecuador has qualified one male and one female athlete in the badminton competition.

Men

Women

Mixed

Beach volleyball

Ecuador has qualified a women's team in the beach volleyball competition.

Bowling

Ecuador has qualified two male bowlers.

Men

Individual

Pairs

Boxing

Ecuador has qualified athletes in all men's categories of the boxing competition.

Canoeing

Ecuador has qualified one boat in the C-1 200, K1-200 and K-2 200 men's category and K1-200, K1-500 and K2-500 women's category.

Men

Women

Cycling

Road Cycling

Men

Women

Track cycling

Sprints & Pursuit

Omnium

Mountain Biking
Women

Cycling BMX

Equestrian

Dressage

Eventing

Individual jumping

Team jumping

Football

Ecuador has qualified a men's team in the football competition.

Men

Squad

Juan Carlos Anangonó
Dixon Arroyo
Roberto Castro
Alex Colon
Luis Congo
Christian Cruz
Wilson Folleco
Edder Fuertes
John Jaramillo
Danny Luna
Deison Mendez
John Narvaez
Marco Nazareno
Johan Padilla
Carlos Quillupangui
Dennis Quinonez
Michael Quiñónez
Enner Valencia

Standings

Results

Match was moved to October 25, because of a volcanic eruption spewed ash clouds in Chile which prevented the team from Uruguay to travel to Guadalajara in time.

Gymnastics

Artistic
Ecuador has qualified two male and two female athletes in the artistic gymnastics competition.

Men

Individual qualification & Team Finals

Individual Finals

Women

Individual qualification & Team Finals

Individual Finals

Judo

Ecuador has qualified two athletes in the 60 kg and 66 kg men's categories and five athletes in the 48 kg, 57 kg, 70 kg, 78 kg, and 78+kg women's categories.

Men

Repechage Rounds

Women

Repechage Rounds

Karate

Ecuador has qualified two athletes in the 67 kg and 75 kg men's categories and one athlete in the 55 kg women's category

Modern pentathlon

Ecuador has qualified two male and one female pentathlete.

Men

Women

Racquetball

Ecuador has qualified three male and two female athletes in the racquetball competition.

Men

Women

Roller skating

Ecuador has qualified a men's team in the roller skating competition.

Men

Rowing

Men

Sailing

Ecuador has qualified three boats and six athletes in the sailing competition.

Men

Women

Shooting

Ecuador has qualified five shooters (one man and three women).

Men

Women

Swimming

Men

Women

Table tennis

Ecuador has qualified three male athletes in the table tennis competition.

Men

Taekwondo

Ecuador has qualified one athletes in the 68 kg men's categories and one athlete in the 49 kg women's category.

Men

Women

Tennis

Men

Women

Mixed doubles

Triathlon

Men

Women

Water skiing

Men

Weightlifting

Wrestling

Ecuador has qualified four athletes in the 55 kg, 66 kg, 74 kg, and 120 kg men's freestyle competition, two athletes in the 66 kg and 120 kg men's Greco-Roman competition, and two athletes in the 48 kg and 55 kg women's freestyle competition.

Men
Freestyle

Greco-Roman

Women
Freestyle

References

Nations at the 2011 Pan American Games
P
2011